False Idol is the sixth studio album by American metalcore band Veil of Maya, released on October 20, 2017, through Sumerian Records. The instrumental parts of the album were produced by Max Schad, while vocal parts were produced by Brandon Paddock.

Track listing

Personnel

Veil of Maya
 Lukas Magyar – vocals
 Marc Okubo – guitars, programming
 Danny Hauser – bass
 Sam Applebaum – drums

Crew
Max Schad – production (instruments)
Brandon Paddock – production (vocals)
Cason Fredrikson – art and design
Daniel Braunstein – mastering

Charts

References

2017 albums
Veil of Maya albums
Sumerian Records albums